Zhdanov or Zhdanova (feminine; Жданова) is a surname. Notable people with the surname include:
 Andrei Zhdanov (1896–1948), Stalinist politician, developer of the Zhdanov Doctrine that governed Soviet cultural activities for a number of years
 Alexander Zhdanov (1858–?), Russian astronomer
 Igor Zhdanov (1920-1996), Latvian chess master
 Ihor Zhdanov (born 1967), Ukrainian politician and businessman. 3rd Minister of Youth and Sports of Ukraine
 Ivan Zhdanov (born 1988), Russian politician and lawyer, director of the Anti-Corruption Foundation
 Leonid Zhdanov (1890–?), Russian selectionist
 Leonid Zhdanov (1927–2009), Russian ballet dancer, teacher and photographer, younger brother of Yury Zhdanov
 Lev Zhdanov (1864–?), Russian novelist and playwright
 Vasily Zhdanov (born 1963), Soviet cyclist
 Victor M. Zhdanov (1914–1987), Russian virologist, instrumental in the push for global smallpox eradication
 Vladimir Zhdanov (1902–1964), Soviet army officer and Hero of the Soviet Union
 Yevgeny Zhdanov (1839–1892), Russian land surveyor and cartographer
 Yuri Zhdanov (1919–2006), Russian chemist, rector of Rostov State University from 1957 to 1988; son of Andrei Zhdanov and former husband of Svetlana Alliluyeva
 Yury Zhdanov (dancer) (1925–1986), Russian ballet dancer, teacher, artist and choreographer, brother of Leonid Zhdanov

Russian-language surnames